The Korba Thermal Power Station or Korba East Thermal Power Station is a coal-fired power station at Korba East in Chhattisgarh, India. The power station is owned and operated by Chhattisgarh State Power Generation Company, publicly owned generation utility formed in 2009 following the restructuring of the Chhattisgarh State Electricity Board.

Capacity
The installed capacity of the power plant is 450 Megawatts (4x50 MW, 2x120 MW).

References

External links
 

Coal-fired power stations in Chhattisgarh
Korba district
Korba, Chhattisgarh
1966 establishments in Madhya Pradesh
Energy infrastructure completed in 1966